Dubai Hospital is a public hospital in Dubai, United Arab Emirates, and is part of Dubai Department of Health and Medical Services.

Although the decision to construct Dubai Hospital was made in 1977, it did not begin admitting patients until March, 1983.

The hospital consists of 14 stories, with the lower two for Accident & Emergency and outpatients, and the upper ten for wards.

Medical Services
The hospital offers the following services: 
 Anesthesia
 Ophthalmology
 Orthopedic
 Pediatric
 Obstetrics
 Urology
 Endocrinology
 Nephrology
 Rheumatology
 Oncology
 E.N.T.

The following clinical support services are offered:
 Radiology 
 Nuclear Medicine/Medical Physics
 Physiotherapy 
 Psychology Services

See also
Rashid Hospital

References

Hospital buildings completed in 1977
Hospitals established in 1983
Buildings and structures in Dubai
Hospitals in Dubai